Sveti Ilija (Serbian Cyrillic: Свети Илија) is a mountain in southern Serbia, above the city of Vranje. Its highest peak has an elevation of 1271 meters above sea level.

References

Mountains of Serbia